The following lists events that happened during 1976 in Australia.

Incumbents

Monarch – Elizabeth II
Governor-General – Sir John Kerr
Prime Minister – Malcolm Fraser
Deputy Prime Minister – Doug Anthony
Opposition Leader – Gough Whitlam
Chief Justice – Sir Garfield Barwick

State and Territory Leaders
Premier of New South Wales – Tom Lewis (until 23 January), then Sir Eric Willis (until 14 May), then Neville Wran
Opposition Leader – Neville Wran (until 14 May), then Sir Eric Willis
Premier of Queensland – Joh Bjelke-Petersen
Opposition Leader – Tom Burns
Premier of South Australia – Don Dunstan
Opposition Leader – David Tonkin
Premier of Tasmania – Bill Neilson
Opposition Leader – Max Bingham
Premier of Victoria – Rupert Hamer
Opposition Leader – Clyde Holding
Premier of Western Australia – Sir Charles Court
Opposition Leader – John Tonkin (until 15 April), then Colin Jamieson
Majority Leader of the Northern Territory – Goff Letts

Governors and Administrators
Governor of New South Wales – Sir Roden Cutler
Governor of Queensland – Sir Colin Hannah
Governor of South Australia – Sir Mark Oliphant (until 30 November), then Sir Douglas Nicholls
Governor of Tasmania – Sir Stanley Burbury
Governor of Victoria – Sir Henry Winneke
Governor of Western Australia – Sir Wallace Kyle
Administrator of Norfolk Island – Charles Buffett (until 31 May), then Edward Pickerd (until 4 September), then Desmond O'Leary

Events

January
5 January – The Family Law Act comes into effect, Elizabeth Evatt is sworn in as first Chief Justice of the Family Court of Australia.
31 January – The Prime Minister Malcolm Fraser states that no "soft options" were left to get Australia out of its economic difficulties.  In a major statement backing his Government's surprise opposition to wage indexations, he said it was a matter of wage increase or jobs.

February
1 February – Five killed when two light planes collide above Parafield Airport, 16 km north of Adelaide. 
9 February – Victorian Premier Rupert Hamer announces a 20 March election date, saying it is the most convenient date because of the Premiers' Conferences due to be held in Canberra in late April and June.
11 February – Liberal member for Clayfield, Queensland resigns.

March
2 March – Cyclone Colin affects the south Queensland coast, forcing the suspension of shipping services into Brisbane and causing winds of up to 93 km an hour.
3 March – The key man in the Labor campaign fund allegations, Henry Fischer, breaks his silence to deny accusations that the Iraqi Government had offered money to the Australian Labor Party for election expenses last December.
18 March – After another day of heavy withdrawals from building societies in Queensland, the Federal Treasurer Phillip Lynch steps in to reassure investors, saying that there was no reason why the events in Queensland – where five building societies have been suspended – should affect other States.  
27 March – Brisbane City Council election.

May
1 May – Neville Wran becomes Premier of New South Wales.
3 May – Federal Opposition Leader Gough Whitlam names the former Liberal minister he claims accepted bribes from the American Lockheed Corporation – the late Sir Shane Partridge – Defence Minister from 1964 to 1966.

June
1 June – 
Prime Minister Malcolm Fraser sets out his foreign policy objectives in a statement to the House of Representatives. He expresses his concerns about the ambitions of the Soviet Union (evidenced by its intervention in Vietnam and Angola), the strength of Warsaw Pact forces confronting NATO and naval expansion in the Indian Ocean. He condemns 'undue world criticism' of the United States and emphasises the importance of Australia's relations with Japan and China, as well as stressing the importance of close relations with the ASEAN countries, especially Indonesia.
The Federal Government fails in another attempt to persuade Queensland Premier Joh Bjelke-Petersen that the Australian-Papua New Guinea border in Torres Strait should be moved south.  
5 June – The Fraser Government and PNG Ministers finally decide that the inhabited Torres Strait islands would remain part of Australia, though the seabed boundary would move. 
8 June – Cabinet agrees to a series of changes in the law governing the establishment, operation, management and supervision of building societies, following a run on a number of building societies, the temporary suspension of five and then the collapse of two of them, the Great Australian and City Savings Permanent Building societies, with a joint deficiency of $3.7 million. The Cabinet creates a contingency fund, funded by a compulsory levy on all permanent building societies in Queensland.
15 June – Prime Minister Malcolm Fraser and his wife arrive in Japan.
16 June – The Australia-Japan Treaty of Friendship is signed, confirming the important trade relations between the two nations. 
29 June – New South Wales State Cabinet decides to appoint a three-member board of review to inquire into the future of the Eastern Suburbs Railway.

July
12 July – The Australian Council of Trade Unions (ACTU) calls a national 24-hour strike over Medibank charges.
29 July – In Brisbane, a police inspector hits a girl on the head with a baton during protests by university students through city streets, sparking calls for an inquiry into police powers.

August
1 August – 
The 483-page report of the Royal Commission on Australian Government Administration is released, recommending overturning the centralised system of decision-making in the Commonwealth Public Service and allowing much greater sharing of power between officers and departments. The report is the product of two years of work.
29 Australians are evacuated from Peking, China after Chinese authorities warn of the possibility of a new powerful earthquake.

August
2 August – 
Defence Minister James Killen rejects allegations made by former Deputy Prime Minister Jim Cairns that Australian soldiers were responsible for the alleged massacre of 27 people in Vietnam in July 1970.
New South Wales Premier Neville Wran calls for the abolition of the New South Wales bank holiday.
4 August – New South Wales Premier Neville Wran announces that the State Government will invest $120,000 in the film "The Picture Show Man" – the state's first big investment in film-making in many years.
5 August – New allegations are made on the ABC program This Day Tonight claiming that Australian servicemen killed unarmed civilians in Vietnam.
10 August – 
The New South Wales Government guarantees an extra $15 million for the Sydney Water Board to create 750 more jobs the 1976–77 financial year in an effort to relieve increasing unemployment in the state.
Max Hodges is removed from the position of Queensland Police Minister due to his unresolved disagreements with the Queensland Police Union.  He is replaced by Tom Newberry.
17 August – The Federal budget is handed down – it predicts a deficit of $2,608 million and an inflation rate of 8–9% by mid-1977.

September
1 September – Cigarette and tobacco advertising banned on television and radio.
30 September – Blue Hills, the long-running ABC radio serial, comes to an end after 32 years.

October
1 October – Medibank Private is established following legislation passed allowing the Health Insurance Commission (HIC) to enter the private health insurance business.
16 October – Liberal candidate, Tony Bourke, wins the Lockyer by-election in Queensland, the state seat vacated by Sir Gordon Chalk.
26 October – The Federal Government is given a report recommending that mining should stop on Fraser Island.
28 October – Mr Justice Russell Walter Fox delivers his first report resulting from his inquiry into the proposed Ranger mine in the Northern Territory.

November
4 November – A White Paper on defence is tabled in Parliament.  This notes that Britain, Australia's traditional protector, is no longer a significant power east of Suez and that Australia's defence must become increasingly self-reliant. 
5 November – In Brisbane, after a trial that lasted 126 days, a jury finds three men not guilty of official corruption charges. One was a serving policeman, the second the person who had allegedly been involved in trying to bribe him and the third a policeman who had retired. That last man, Jack Reginald Herbert, was later to admit (to the Fitzgerald Inquiry) to his guilt for this and many similar crimes, and to implicate Sir Terry Lewis as an active member of the 'Joke'.
10 November – The Fraser Island Report recommendations are accepted by the Federal Government but resisted by Queensland Premier Joh Bjelke-Petersen.
15 November – Ray Whitrod resigns as Queensland Police Commissioner, claiming he could no longer function under such a high level of government interference.
18 November – Prime Minister Malcolm Fraser announces that Treasury will be split into separate departments of Treasury and Finance.
28 November – Federal Cabinet agrees to a 17.5% devaluation of the dollar (which brought it almost to parity with the US dollar) and the 'adoption of a flexibly administered exchange rate, somewhat along the lines of a "managed float".’ Financial institutions would be closely monitored to ensure that lending 'comes back from recent excessive and unsustainable levels', government expenditure would be reviewed once again and the strongest possible arguments for restraint would be put to the December quarter National Wage Case.

December
4 December – The Royal Australian Navy's fleet of Grumman Tracker aircraft is destroyed by arson at Nowra, New South Wales
16 December – The Aboriginal Land Rights (Northern Territory) Act is enacted.
17 December – Cabinet agrees to establish a Human Rights Commission to deal with complaints of discrimination on the grounds of race or on other grounds prohibited by future Commonwealth laws. The Commission would review existing and future Commonwealth and state laws, and report on their consistency with the International Covenant on Civil and Political Rights, to which Australia was a signatory but not a party.

 Edward (Weary) Dunlop is announced as Australian of the Year
 Mining on Fraser Island ends.
 Random Breath Testing introduced in Victoria

Arts and literature

 Brett Whiteley wins the Archibald Prize with Self Portrait in the Studio
 David Ireland's novel The Glass Canoe wins the Miles Franklin Award

Film
 Don's Party
 Storm Boy
 The Fourth Wish

Television
Nine Network soap operas The Young Doctors and The Sullivans both begin on air in November.

Sport
31 July – Victor Anderson wins the men's national marathon title, clocking 2:23:28.6 in Sydney.
 Van der Hum wins the Melbourne Cup
 South Australia wins the Sheffield Shield
 Ballyhoo takes line honours and Piccolo wins on handicap in the Sydney to Hobart Yacht Race
 Hawthorn were premiers of the Victorian Football League
 Australia defeats the West Indies 5–1 in the cricket test series
 Geoff Hunt wins the men's squash World Open
 Minor premiers Manly defeats Parramatta 13–10 to win the 1976 New South Wales Rugby League Premiership. Newtown finish in last position, claiming the wooden spoon.

Births
 9 January – Amy Gillett (died 2005), cyclist
 18 January – Damien Leith, singer
 17 February – Matthew Lappin, Australian rules footballer
 19 February – Travis Denney, badminton player
 24 February – Bradley McGee, cyclist
 28 February – David Bradbury, politician
 25 March – Naomi Young, synchronized swimmer
 28 April – Paul Cleary, middle-distance runner
 27 May – Bianca Netzler, field hockey player
 4 June – Kasey Chambers, singer
 21 June – Nigel Lappin, Australian rules footballer
 22 July – Liam Renton, radio, TV and podcast personality
 6 August
Adam Ritson, rugby league player
Shaun Timmins, rugby league player
 24 August - Alex O'Loughlin, actor
 27 August – Mark Webber, Formula 1 driver
 1 September – Marcos Ambrose, racing driver
 7 September – Carmel Bakurski, field hockey defender
 15 September – Brett Kimmorley, Rugby league footballer
 5 October –  Coby Beatson, Teacher, Singer, Survivor
 16 October - Draxon Bailo Artist, Actor, Musician
 7 November – Mark Philippoussis, tennis player
 8 November – Brett Lee, cricketer
 18 November – Matt Welsh, swimmer
 30 November – Gail Miller, water polo player
 6 December – Paul Crake, racing cyclist
 31 December – Craig Reucassel, comedian

Deaths
 8 February – Gladys Moncrieff, singer (b. 1892)
 21 May – Harold Blair, singer and activist (b. 1924)
 17 June – Lord Casey, 16th Governor-General of Australia (b. 1890)
 10 August – Bert Oldfield, cricketer (b. 1894)
 21 September – Peter Crimmins, Australian rules footballer (Hawthorn) (b. 1943)
 13 October – Ivor Greenwood, Victorian politician (b. 1926)
 23 October – Ian Mudie, poet and author (b. 1911)

See also
 1976 in Australian television
 List of Australian films of 1976

References

 
Australia
Years of the 20th century in Australia